The 2017 Rugby League World Cup featured fourteen international teams, with each consisting of a twenty-four-man squad.

Pool A

Australia
Head coach:  Mal Meninga

Australia's 24-man squad is composed entirely of players who play in the NRL. In the days following the initial squad announcement, Andrew Fifita withdrew from the squad in order to represent Tonga while Darius Boyd withdrew due to an ongoing hamstring injury. Campbell-Gillard and Mansour were named as the respective replacements. Seven members of the squad are uncapped for the Kangaroos (Campbell-Gillard, Gagai, Graham, Kaufusi, McLean, Munster, and T. Trbojevic).

England
Head coach:  Wayne Bennett

Uncapped players Currie and Walmsley have been included in a squad that is very similar to the one that was named to played Samoa earlier in the year. Zak Hardaker was not considered for selection after he tested positive for cocaine four weeks prior to the squad announcement, the details of which were publicly reported only hours before said announcement. All 24 players were selected from the top-tier Super League or NRL competitions.

France
Head coach:  Aurélien Cologni

In addition to the twenty-four man squad, four players were named as alternatives: Kevin Larroyer, Lambert Belmas, Rémy Marginet and Ilias Bergal. 
Gadwin Springer was initially named in the squad but withdrew due to a groin injury. He was replaced by Belmas.
Guillaume Bonnet was initially named in the squad but withdrew due to a ligament injury. He was replaced by Marginet. Hakim Miloudi was initially named in the squad but was dropped due to disciplinary reasons. He was replaced by Bergal.

Lebanon
Head coach:  Brad Fittler

Reece Robinson was initially named in the squad but withdrew due to injury. He was replaced by Daniel Abou-Sleiman.

Pool B

New Zealand
Head coach:  David Kidwell

Kevin Proctor and captain Jesse Bromwich were not considered for selection after being caught buying and using cocaine following the 2017 Anzac Test in May; Blair was subsequently named captain for the tournament. Five uncapped players (Asofa-Solomona, Fonua-Blake, Levi, Liu, and Takairangi) are included in the squad as Tohu Harris, Jordan Kahu, Kieran Foran, and Ben Matulino were ruled out by injury, while Jason Taumalolo opted to represent his Tongan heritage over the Kiwis.

Samoa
Head coach:  Matt Parish

Sione Mata'utia and Tautau Moga were initially named in the squad but withdrew due to injury. They were replaced by Lafai and Winterstein. Luai, Musgrove, Papalii, and Tevaga are the only uncapped players for Samoa, with Luai making an unexpected appearance in the squad as the only player without NRL experience.

Scotland
Head coach:  Steve McCormack

Ryan Brierley was originally selected, but withdrew after failing a fitness test. He was replaced by Oakes. Brooks, Brough, and Walker were dropped on 5 November for disciplinary reasons.

Tonga
Head coach:  Kristian Woolf

Pool C

Ireland
Head coach:  Mark Aston

Mikey Russell is the travelling reserve. Toby King was initially named in the squad but withdrew due to injury. He was replaced by Michael Morgan.

Papua New Guinea
Head coach:  Michael Marum

Wales
Head coach:  John Kear

Pool D

Fiji
Head coach:  Mick Potter

Nabua Broncos' Etuate Bola was named as a reserve player. Sokobalavu was called into the squad following injuries to Evans and K. Sims.

Italy
Head coach:  Cameron Ciraldo

Italy named a squad of 33 players before shortening the squad to 24 players. Four shadow players were also named: Jake Campagnolo, Dean Parata, Ricardo Parata, and Kieran Quabba.

United States
Head coach:  Brian McDermott

The Hawks continue to support the growth of rugby league in the United States by selecting fourteen players who have played in the amateur USA Rugby League competition, three of whom have since been signed by professional clubs (Burroughs, Eichner, and Offerdahl). Nine members of the squad (Faraimo, Farley, Freed, both Howard brothers, Marando, Offerdahl, Pettybourne, and Shipway) previously represented the Tomahawks at the 2013 World Cup, and three players have experience in the NRL, all of whom are eligible to represent the US through their American Samoan heritage (Faraimo, Pettybourne, and Vaivai). Samoa, also of American Samoan descent, was a late inclusion to the squad due to an injury to Matt Walsh.

References

Squads
Rugby League World Cup squads